
Gmina Działoszyn is an urban-rural gmina (administrative district) in Pajęczno County, Łódź Voivodeship, in central Poland.

Villages
Apart from the town of Działoszyn, Gmina Działoszyn contains the villages and settlements of Bobrowniki, Bugaj, Draby, Grądy-Łazy, Kapituła, Kiedosy, Lisowice, Lisowice-Kolonia, Młynki, Niżankowice, Patoki Małe, Posmykowizna, Raciszyn, Sadowiec, Sadowiec-Niwa, Sadowiec-Pieńki, Sadowiec-Wrzosy, Sęsów, Szczepany, Szczyty, Szczyty-Błaszkowizna, Szczyty-Las, Tasarze, Trębaczew, Węże, Wójtostwo, Zalesiaki and Zalesiaki-Pieńki.

Neighbouring gminas
Gmina Działoszyn is bordered by the gminas of Lipie, Pajęczno, Pątnów, Popów, Siemkowice and Wierzchlas.

References
Polish official population figures 2006
The Lost Jewish Community of Działoszyn/Zaloshin

Dzialoszyn
Pajęczno County